Groß Polzin is a municipality in the Vorpommern-Greifswald district, in Mecklenburg-Vorpommern, Germany.

References

External links

Vorpommern-Greifswald